An intra-company transfer is where a company reassigns an employee to work in a different physical office space. Many countries offer expedited processes to obtain travel visas and work permits for intra-company transfers if the applicant performs certain categories of work. These categories of work may include executives, managers, long-term employees, and those with specialized expertise.

References

Employee relations